Ouida Bergère (born Eunie Branch; December 14, 1886 – November 29, 1974) was an American screenwriter and actress.

Biography
Eunie Branch was born in Madrid, Spain, the daughter of Stephen W. and Ida Branch, both natives of Tennessee. Her early years were spent in Madrid, Paris and England. She came to the U.S. at eight years of age. Her father was a merchant who later worked as a railroad timekeeper. By the time of the taking of the 1900 Federal Census she was living with her brother's family in Searcy, Arkansas as Eunie Branch.

A decade later she is listed in the census with her parents in Little Rock, Arkansas as Eula Burgess. Her marital status then was recorded as divorced and occupation, actress. In January of that year she appeared as Ouida Bergère playing the stenographer in the play Via Wireless and was one of few cast members to receive positive reviews in the production.

Career
Bergère began her career as an actress. Playwright Winchell Smith gave her her first role, but she eventually abandoned her stage career and turned her attention to writing. She wrote for the New York Herald and for various magazines, and wrote the stories for silent film productions.

She wrote most of the stories for the films of Elsie Ferguson, and many for Mae Murray, including On With the Dance. She also wrote for Pola Negri, Corinne Griffith, Bert Lytell, and Betty Compson, many of which were directed by her second husband George Fitzmaurice. In 1920, she wrote the screen version of Peter Ibbetson, starring  Elsie Ferguson and Wallace Reid. During this time, she met Basil Rathbone, who was playing the lead role in the stage production of the play, and they eventually married in 1926.

As well as the United States, Bergère worked on films in England, France and Italy. While in Rome, she wrote a screenplay titled The Eternal City (1923), based on the Hall Caine novel, directed by her husband George Fitzmaurice, and released by the Samuel Goldwyn Company. The film enlisted the assistance of the Fascists, and of Mussolini, with the help of the American ambassador in Rome. The film included a scene in which Mussolini appeared writing a letter and summoning a man to post it. 10,000 Blackshirts appeared in the Coliseum scenes for the film.

Family
After her marriage to actor Basil Rathbone on April 18, 1926, Bergère gave up her film work to assist him in his work and in the management of his business affairs. Together they had one child, an adopted daughter named Cynthia Rathbone (1939–1969), and raised Ouida's niece, Ouida Branch, who married David Bruce Huxley, brother of Julian Huxley, Aldous Huxley, and Andrew Huxley.

Death
Bergere died about two weeks shy of her 88th birthday at Roosevelt Hospital in New York from complications after falling and breaking her hip. She was survived by her younger brother Bernice C. Branch. She is buried next to her husband at Ferncliff Cemetery in New York.

Filmography

Writer

 The Eternal City (1923)
 Six Days (1923)
 The Cheat (1923)
 The Rustle of Silk (1923)
 Bella Donna (1923)
 Kick In (1923)
 The Man from Home (1922)
 Three Live Ghosts (1922)
 Peacock Alley (1922)
 Peter Ibbetson (1921)
 Paying the Piper (1921)
 Idols of Clay (1920)
 The Right to Love (1920)
 On With the Dance (1920)
 The Broken Melody (1919)
 Counterfeit (1919)
 The Witness for the Defense (1919)
 A Society Exile (1919)
 Our Better Selves (1919)
 The Avalanche (1919)
 The Profiteers (1919)
 The Cry of the Weak (1919)
 Common Clay (1919)
 The Narrow Path (1918)
 A Japanese Nightingale (1918)
 More Trouble (1918)
 The Hillcrest Mystery (1918)
 The On-the-Square Girl (1917)
 The Iron Heart (1917)
 Kick In (1917)
 The Romantic Journey (1916)
 Arms and the Woman (1916)
 Big Jim Garrity (1916)
 Virtue Triumphant (1916)
 New York (1916)
 Wasted Lives (1915)
 At Bay (1915)
 Saints and Sinners (1915)
 The Esterbrook Case (1915)

Casting director
 At Bay (1915)

Actress
 Getting Even (1912)
 Mates and Mis-Mates (1912)

References

External links

 Ouida Bergere at Women Film Pioneers Project

American film actresses
American silent film actresses
American stage actresses
American women screenwriters
1886 births
1974 deaths
Actresses from Little Rock, Arkansas
Writers from Little Rock, Arkansas
Accidental deaths from falls
Accidental deaths in New York (state)
20th-century American actresses
Women film pioneers
Screenwriters from Arkansas
Burials at Ferncliff Cemetery
20th-century American women writers
20th-century American screenwriters
American expatriates in Spain
American expatriates in France
American expatriates in the United Kingdom